Edith Meserve Atkinson (November 20, 1890 - August 14, 1983) was the first female judge (juvenile court) in Dade County, Florida, from 1924 to 1932. She was also the founder of Girl Scouting in Miami, Florida.

See also
Scouting in Florida
List of first women lawyers and judges in Florida

References

Scouting pioneers
Girl Scouts of the USA people
1890 births
1983 deaths
20th-century American women
People from Florida